Claudia Piñeiro (born 1960) is an Argentine novelist and screenwriter, best known for her crime and mystery novels, most of which became best sellers in Argentina. She was born in Burzaco, Buenos Aires province. She has won numerous literary prizes, among them the German  for Elena Sabe and the Sor Juana Inés de la Cruz Prize for Las grietas de Jara.

Five of her novels have been translated into English by Bitter Lemon Press and Charco Press, as well as adapted into feature films.

In April 2022, her novel Elena Knows, translated into English by Frances Riddle, was shortlisted for the International Booker Prize.

Works

Novels
 Catedrales (Buenos Aires: Alfaguara, 2020)
 Las maldiciones (Buenos Aires: Alfaguara, 2017)
 Una suerte pequeña (Buenos Aires: Alfaguara 2015)
 Un comunista en calzoncillos (Buenos Aires: Alfaguara, 2013)
 Betibú (Buenos Aires: Alfaguara, 2011). 
 Betty Boo. Bitter Lemon Press, 2016, 
 Las grietas de Jara (Buenos Aires: Alfaguara, 2009) 
 A Crack in the Wall. Bitter Lemon Press, 2013, 
 Elena sabe (Buenos Aires: Alfaguara 2007) 
 Elena Knows, tr. Frances Riddle, Charco Press 2021, 
 Tuya (Buenos Aires: Colihue, 2006, Alfaguara, 2008). , 
 All Yours, Bitter Lemon Press, 2012, 
 Las viudas de los jueves (Buenos Aires: Alfaguara, 2005, 2011 Madrid: Alfaguara, 2012). , 
 Thursday Night Widows. Bitter Lemon Press, 2009,

Theatre
 Con las manos atadas, 2013 Buenos Aires: Interzona, 2013
 Tres viejas plumas, 2008 Buenos Aires: Interzona, 2013
 Morite, gordo, 2007 Buenos Aires: Interzona, 2013
 Verona, 2007 Buenos Aires: Interzona, 2013
 Un mismo árbol verde, 2006 Buenos Aires: Interzona, 2013
 Cuánto vale una heladera Buenos Aires: Ministerio de Educación, 2005; Interzona, 2013
 Obra teatral Buenos Aires: Interzona, 2013, 203 pp. (consists of all the theater plays mentioned above)

Stories for children
 Serafín, el escritor y la bruja (Buenos Aires: Ed. Don Bosco 2000, Alfaguara 2011, 85 pp. Barcelona: Edebé 2000, 2007).
 Un ladrón entre nosotros (Bogotá: Norma 2005, 92 pp.).

For young readers
 El fantasma de las invasiones inglesas (Buenos Aires: Norma 2010, 126 pp.)

Awards

 Premio Clarín de Novela 2005
 Premio Pepe Carvalho de novela negra 2018
 Longlist for Barbellion Prize 2020

References

1960 births
Argentine dramatists and playwrights
Argentine crime fiction writers
Argentine women novelists
Living people